Ballyboodan Ogham Stone (CIIC 038) is an ogham stone and National Monument located in County Kilkenny, Ireland.

Location

History

Ballyboodan Ogham Stone was carved c. AD 700–900. It was rediscovered before 1841, and was knocked down by treasure-seekers. In 1850 the tenant of the land wanted to destroy it as an obstacle to the plough, but luckily it was saved by the landlord, Sir Hercules Richard Langrishe, 3rd Baronet.

Description

Ballyboodan Ogham Stone is a block of slate measuring 231 × 175 × 23 cm and has Ogham carvings incised on one edge.  (CORBI KOI MAQI LABRID, "Here is Corb, son of Labraid").

References

National Monuments in County Kilkenny
Ogham inscriptions
7th-century inscriptions
8th-century inscriptions